Fănel Țîră (born 8 June 1966) is a retired Romanian football midfielder and manager. He is the father of Cătălin Țîră.

Honours
Drobeta-Turnu Severin
Divizia C: 1983–84
Rapid București
Divizia B: 1989–90
Jiul Petroșani
Divizia B: 1995–96

Notes

References

External links

1966 births
Living people
Romanian footballers
Association football midfielders
Liga I players
Liga II players
FC Drobeta-Turnu Severin players
FC Rapid București players
Victoria București players
CSM Jiul Petroșani players
AFC Rocar București players
ASC Daco-Getica București players
Romanian football managers
ASC Daco-Getica București managers